Gámbita is a municipality in the department of Santander, Colombia, is part of the Comunera province. The municipality has a land area of 606.1 km2 and is formed by the corresponding municipal seat to the urban area, 20 villages and district of La Palma.

Geography 
Gámbita has a natural heritage and landscape that offers EGS like owning great sources of water, oxygen, uptake of carbon dioxide and resources Flora  and wildlife practicable steps to ensure the quality of life, environmental sustainability and economic development in the medium and long term, developing activities in accordance with the restrictions on land use, accompanied by training environmental, social and economic resources and technology transfer for cleaner production, in order to reach niche markets for products derived from sugarcane, fruits and vegetables.

Likewise, the livestock, the bee culture and farming are production alternatives with high environmental and economic viability level in the municipality.

Personalities 
 Luis Antonio Calvo (1882 - 1945) Composer

Municipalities of Santander Department